This is a list of Eastern Orthodox monasteries that are individually notable.

In Europe

Bulgaria
Aladzha Monastery
Albotin Monastery
Arapovo Monastery
Bachkovo Monastery
Basarabi Cave Complex
Belashtitsa Monastery
Chiprovtsi Monastery
Dragalevtsi Monastery
Dryanovo Monastery
Etropole Monastery
Glozhene Monastery
Klisurski Monastery
Kremikovtsi Monastery
Lopushna Monastery
Monastery of Saint Athanasius
Patriarchal Monastery of the Holy Trinity
Peshtera Monastery
Rafail's Cross
Razboishte Monastery
Rila Monastery
Rozhen Monastery
Ruen Monastery
Seven Altars Monastery
Sokolski Monastery
Transfiguration Monastery
Troyan Monastery
Zemen Monastery

Finland
Lintula Holy Trinity Convent
New Valamo

France
Château de Saint-Hubert (Chavenon)

Georgia
Alaverdi Monastery
Betania Monastery
Bodbe Monastery
Chulevi Monastery
David Gareja monastery complex
Gelati Monastery
Gudarekhi
Ikalto
Jvari (monastery)
Katskhi Monastery
Katskhi pillar
Kintsvisi Monastery
Kvatakhevi
Martvili Monastery
Monastery of the Cross
Parekhi
Pitareti Monastery
Sapara Monastery
Shavnabada Monastery
Shio-Mgvime monastery
Skhalta Cathedral
Tbeti Monastery
Timotesubani
Tserakvi
Ubisi
Urbnisi
Vanis Kvabebi
Vardzia
Zarzma monastery
Zedazeni Monastery

Greek Orthodox Church of Antioch
 Cherubim – Saidnaya Patriarchal Monastery, Syria
 Dormition of the Theotokos Monastery, also known as Hamatoura Monastery, Kousba
 Holy Archangel Michael Monastery, Baskinta
 Holy Transfiguration Monastery, Kafr Ram, Homs
 Holy Trinity Family Monasteries, Douma
 Monastery of Saint Elijah, Btina
 Saint Elias Monastery (Shwayya, Lebanon)
 Balamand Monastery, Lebanon
 Our Lady of Saidnaya Monastery, Syria
 Saint Elian Monastery, Homs
 Saint George – Saidnaya Patriarchal Monastery
 Saint George's Monastery, Homs
 Saint George Monastery, Mhardeh, Hama
 Saint John the Baptist Monastery, Aleppo
 Convent of Saint Thecla (Maaloula)
 Monastery of Saint Mema, Deir Mimas
 Resurrection Orthodox Convent, France
 Vision of Saint Paul the Apostle Patriarchal Monastery, Tal Kokab
 Our Lady of Achrafieh, Beirut
 Our Lady of Aleppo, Syria
 Our Lady of Bdebba, Koura, Lebanon
 Our Lady of Bkeftine, Tripoli
 Our Lady of Blemmana, Syria
 Our Lady of Keftoun, Lebanon
 Our Lady of El Natour, Anfeh
 Our Lady of Nourieh, Lebanon
 Saint Catherine Monastery, Achrafieh
 Saint Dimitrios Monastery, Kousba
 Saint George Monastery, Deir el-Harf
 Saint George Monastery, Amyoun
 Saint Jacob Monastery, Deddeh
 Saint John the Baptist Orthodox Monastery, Anfeh
 Saint Simon Monastery, Chekka

Cyprus
Apostolos Andreas Monastery
Chrysoroyiatissa Monastery
Kykkos Monastery
Machairas Monastery
Notre Dame de Tyre
Panagia Apsinthiotissa
Panagia tou Sinti Monastery
Panagidia Galaktotrofousa monastery
Stavrovouni Monastery
Trooditissa Monastery

Greece
Agia Triada Monastery
Arkadi Monastery
Daphni Monastery
Gouverneto Monastery
Kaisariani Monastery
Monastery of Komnenion
Monastery of Saint George, Skyros
Moni Toplou
Nea Moni of Chios
Preveli
Saint Ignatios Monastery
Monastery of Saint John the Theologian

Meteora
Monastery of the Holy Trinity, Meteora

Epirus
Holy Theotokos' Monastery of Molyvdoskepastos

Mount Athos
Agiou Panteleimonos monastery
Agiou Pavlou monastery
Dionysiou monastery
Dochiariou monastery
Esphigmenou Monastery
Great Lavra (Athos)
Hilandar
Iviron monastery
Karakalou monastery
Konstamonitou monastery
Koutloumousiou monastery
Osiou Gregoriou monastery
Pantokratoros monastery
Philotheou monastery
Simonopetra monastery
Stavronikita monastery
Vatopedi monastery
Xenophontos monastery
Xeropotamou Monastery
Zograf Monastery

North Macedonia
 Church of St. George, Kurbinovo
 Church of St. George, Staro Nagoričane
 Church of St. Nicetas, Banjane
 Karpino Monastery
 Kičevo Monastery
 Lesnovo monastery
 Lešok Monastery
 Marko's Monastery
 Matejić Monastery
 Monastery of Saint Naum
 Osogovo Monastery
 Psača Monastery
 Saint Jovan Bigorski Monastery
 Treskavec Monastery
 Zrze Monastery

Romania

Sveti Đurađ monastery
Bazjaš monastery

Russia
See also List of Russian Orthodox monasteries.

Moscow
 Andronikov Monastery
 Ascension Convent
 Chrysostom Monastery
 Chudov Monastery
 Conception Convent
 Danilov Monastery
 Donskoy Monastery
 Epiphany Monastery
 Intercession Monastery (Moscow)
 Ivanovsky Convent
 Krutitsy
 Marfo-Mariinsky Convent
 Nativity Convent (Moscow)
 Nikolo-Perervinsky Monastery
 Novodevichy Convent
 Novospassky Monastery
 Preobrazhenskoye Cemetery
 Simonov Monastery
 Sretensky Monastery (Moscow)
 Vysokopetrovsky Monastery
 Zaikonospassky monastery

Other
Abraham's Oak Holy Trinity Monastery
Agiou Panteleimonos monastery
Alexander Nevsky Lavra
Alexander-Svirsky Monastery
Andronikov Monastery
Annunciation Monastery (Tolyatti)
Antonievo-Siysky Monastery
Arkazhsky Monastery
Ascension Convent
Belogorsky Convent
Borisoglebsky, Yaroslavl Oblast
Chernigovsky Skit
Christ the Saviour Monastery
Chrysostom Monastery
Chudov Monastery
Coastal Monastery of St. Sergius
Conception Convent
Danilov Monastery
Donskoy Monastery
Epiphany Monastery
Ferapontov Monastery
Ganina Yama
Goritsky Monastery (Goritsy)
Goritsky Monastery (Pereslavl-Zalessky)
Gorne-Uspensky Convent
Ioannovsky Convent
Ipatiev Monastery
Joseph-Volokolamsk Monastery
Kamenny Monastery
Khutyn Monastery
Kirillo-Belozersky Monastery
Kiy Island
Konevsky Monastery
Kozheozersky Monastery
Krutitsy
Krypetsky Monastery
Makaryev Monastery
Marfo-Mariinsky Convent
Mirozhsky Monastery
New Jerusalem Monastery
Nikolo-Perervinsky Monastery
Novodevichy Convent
Novospassky Monastery
Optina Monastery
Pavlo-Obnorsky Monastery
Pechenga Monastery
Pskov-Caves Monastery
Pühtitsa Convent
Nativity Convent (Moscow)
Savvino-Storozhevsky Monastery
Serafimo-Diveyevsky Monastery
Shamordino Convent
Simonov Monastery
Smolny Convent
Solovetsky Monastery
Spaso-Prilutsky Monastery
Sretensky Monastery (Moscow)
Stolobny Island
Svensky Monastery
Theophany Convent, Kostroma
Tikhvin Assumption Monastery
Transfiguration Monastery, Staraya Russa
Trinity Lavra of St. Sergius
Troitse-Gledensky Monastery
Ugresha Monastery
Valaam Monastery
Valday Iversky Monastery
Vyazhishchsky Monastery
Vysokopetrovsky Monastery
Vysotsky Monastery
Yelizarov Convent
Zaikonospassky monastery

Serbian Orthodox

Ukraine
Bakota, Ukraine
Brotherhood Monastery
Florivsky Convent
Kiev Pechersk Lavra
Manyava Skete
Mezhyhirya Monastery
Mhar Monastery
Pochayiv Lavra
St. Michael's Golden-Domed Monastery
Sviatohirsk Lavra
Trakhtemyrov Monastery
Trinity Monastery (Chernihiv)
Trinity Monastery of St. Jonas
Vydubychi Monastery
Zymne Monastery

Other
San Giovanni Theristis
St. George's Monastery

Misc.
Ardenica Monastery
Chrysoskalitissa Monastery
Koutloumousiou monastery
Metochion
Monastery of Stoudios
Monastery of the Panagia Hodegetria
New Skete
Patriarchal Stavropegic Monastery of St. John the Baptist
Solus Christi Brothers
Stauropegic
Supraśl Orthodox Monastery
Zelve Monastery

In the Americas

Canada
All Saints Monastery
The Holy Transfiguration Serbian Orthodox Monastery
Saint Petka Serbian Orthodox Church

United States

Holy Cross Orthodox Monastery (Castro Valley, California)
Holy Trinity Monastery (Jordanville), Jordanville, New York, NRHP-listed
St. Sava's Serbian Orthodox Monastery
New Gračanica Monastery
St. Archangel Michael Skete
St. Pachomious Monastery
St. Paisius Orthodox Monastery
St. Xenia Serbian Orthodox Skete
St. Nilus Island Skete
Episcopal headquarters of the Serbian Orthodox Eparchy of Western America, located at Saint Steven's Serbian Orthodox Cathedral, Alhambra, California
Holy Transfiguration Serbian Orthodox Monastery, Milton, Ontario, Canada
Monastery of St. Paisius, Safford
Saint Herman of Alaska Monastery
St. Mark Serbian Orthodox Monastery

Argentina
 Episcopal headquarters of the Serbian Orthodox Eparchy of Buenos Aires and South America, Buenos Aires, Argentina

In Asia

Holy Land
Mar Elias Monastery
Mar Saba
Monastery of the Temptation
Our Lady of Nourieh
Saint Catherine's Monastery

Korea
Monastery of St. Andreas, Yanggu County, Gangwon
Monastery of the Transfiguration of the Savior, Gapyeong County

Turkey
Bolaman Castle
Cape Jason
Kuştul Monastery
Panagia Theoskepastos Monastery
Sümela Monastery
Vazelon Monastery

See also
Lavra

 
Eastern Orthodox
Monasteries